Bekesbourne is a village near Canterbury in Kent, South East England.

The village is centred  ESE of the city's cathedral and its centre stretches less than 1 km from its railway station to the A2 road to the south.

Amenities
The parish church is dedicated to Saint Peter and has a Norman doorway, a 13th-century chancel and the first recorded example of brick mathematical tiles.

Howletts Wild Animal Park is in Bekesbourne, the home of many endangered species and the world's largest breeding gorilla colony in captivity.

Transport
Bekesbourne railway station serves the area, on the line between Canterbury East and Dover Priory railway stations.

The A2 is a route bordering the south of the village's formal area.

History
Bekesbourne was the site of an aerodrome, built during World War I, and which thrived as the home of the Kent Flying Club until World War II, when it was closed. One large hangar remained. It was severely damaged by and rebuilt after the Great Storm of 1987. Developed reuse took place in 1997 to build 10 detached houses on a new road, De Havillands.

Famous residents
 Bekesbourne was the birthplace of the film director Michael Powell and of Stephen Hales, the physiologist, chemist and inventor.
 Ian Fleming author of the James Bond books lived at the Old Palace in Bekesbourne.

Notes and references
Notes 
  
References

External links

City of Canterbury
Villages in Kent